Steve Ryan (June 19, 1947 – September 3, 2007) was an American actor known for his recurring role as J. Walter Weatherman on the Fox sitcom Arrested Development, Detective Nate Grossman on Crime Story (American TV series) (1986–1988), and Mike Healy on Oz (1997).

Career
He was best known for his recurring role on the Fox sitcom Arrested Development as J. Walter Weatherman. Some of his other roles included "Detective Nate Grossman" on the NBC Police series Crime Story and his role as "Bobick" on Daddio. He had recurring roles as Sgt. Adams on CSI, as Secretary of Defense Miles Hutchinson on The West Wing, as Father Conti on American Dreams, as Officer Mike Healy on Oz, and as Mark Volchek on Wiseguy

Ryan's notable stage appearances included the original Broadway production of I'm Not Rappaport and revivals of On the Waterfront and Guys and Dolls. He also performed at most of America's major regional theatres, including Yale Repertory Theatre, Williamstown Theatre Festival, and Milwaukee Repertory Theater.

Death
Ryan died in Duarte, California, aged 60, from cancer.

Filmography

Film

Television

External links

1947 births
2007 deaths
American male film actors
American male television actors
People from Manhattan
Male actors from New York City
20th-century American male actors
21st-century American male actors